Pakokku Township is a township of Pakokku District in Magway Division of Burma (Myanmar). The principal town and administrative seat is Pakokku.  The township has its eastern and southeastern border along the Irrawaddy where its principal town, Pakokku, is a port. The Yaw River forms the township's southwest border. There is a commercial airport at Lanywa (Lan).

Communities
Among the towns and villages in Pakokku Township are: Anauktaw, Hmaikbingon, Kandaw, Kin, Lanywa (Lan), Myitche and Shwegyaung (Shwe Chaung).

Borders
Pakokku Township is bordered by:
 Myaing Township, to the north,
 Yesagyo Township, to the northeast,
 Nyaung-U Township, to the southeast,
 Seikphyu Township, to the southwest, and
 Pauk Township, to the northwest.

Notes

External links
 "Pakokku Google Satellite Map" map of administrative area with listing of principal settlements, from Maplandia
 "Pakokku Township - Magway Division" Myanmar Information Management Unit (MIMU), 2010

Townships of Magway Region